Cobie-Jane Morgan (born 29 June 1989) is a female rugby union player. She was a member of the squad to the 2010 Women's Rugby World Cup that finished in third place.

She has been named in 's 2014 Women's Rugby World Cup squad.

References

External links
Wallaroos Profile

1985 births
Living people
Australia women's international rugby union players
Australian female rugby union players
Female rugby union players
Australian female rugby sevens players
20th-century Australian women
21st-century Australian women